A by-election was held in the federal riding of Chicoutimi—Le Fjord in Quebec on June 18, 2018, following the resignation of incumbent Liberal MP Denis Lemieux.

The seat was gained by the Conservative Party of Canada, with Richard Martel winning on a large swing of 19 points, becoming the new MP. The result was a surprise as in the 2015 election, the conservative candidate had come in 4th place. Martel's victory was the first by-election loss for the Liberals since 2013.

Background

Constituency 
The riding is located about 200 kilometres north of Quebec City, and consists of the northern part of the Chicoutimi borough of Saguenay, as well as the La Baie borough and the municipalities of Ferland-et-Boilleau, L'Anse-Saint-Jean, Petit-Saguenay, Rivière-Éternité and Saint-Félix-d'Otis and the unorganized territory of Lalemant.

Representation 
The by-election was triggered by the announcement by Liberal MP Denis Lemieux on November 6, 2017, that he would be resigning his seat for family reasons; his resignation took effect on December 1, 2017. Lemieux was first elected in the 2015 federal election with 31.1% of the vote, narrowly defeating NDP incumbent Dany Morin.

Campaign

Liberal 

Port Saguenay board member Lina Boivin, who was endorsed by Lemieux, defeated former Saint-Charles de Bourget mayor Michel Ringuette for the Liberal nomination, held in May 2018. A rumoured candidate for the Liberal nomination was former Paralympic athlete and head of university sport at UQAC, Philippe Gagnon. Former municipal councillor and former Quebec Liberal MNA candidate Joan Simard, local businessman Simon-Pierre Murdock, who later endorsed Boivin, and Chicoutimi-Nord Municipal Councillor Marc Pettersen declined to run for the nomination. "Promotion Saguenay" Director of Industrial Development and Corporate Affairs Claude Bouchard had his candidacy rejected by the federal Liberal party.

New Democrat 

Éric Dubois, a union advisor at the CSN and former federal NDP candidate, was acclaimed as the NDP candidate on January 22, 2018. Dany Morin and former Ontario MPP and federal NDP leader Jagmeet Singh both expressed interest in running for the nomination but decided against it.

Bloc Quebecois 
Catherine Bouchard-Tremblay was acclaimed as the candidate for the Bloc Québécois on May 18, 2018. Former Dubuc PQ MNA Jean-Marie Claveau and teacher Valérie Tremblay were rumoured to be interested in running for the Bloc Québécois nomination. Former Chicoutimi—Le Fjord BQ MP Robert Bouchard, Saguenay firefighter Mario Gagnon, and UQAC political science professor Michel Roche declined to run for the nomination.

The short-lived « Groupe parlementaire québécois » / « Québec debout », formed by seven members of parliament after they left the Bloc Québécois, considered nominating a candidate but failed to do so.

Conservative 
Two-time Ron Lapointe Trophy winning QMJHL coach Richard Martel was named the Conservative candidate on December 20, 2017.

Green 
Lynda Youde was acclaimed as the candidate for the Green Party on May 22, 2018.

Warrant 
The Speaker's warrant regarding the vacancy was received on December 4, 2017; under the Parliament of Canada Act the writ for a by-election had to be dropped no later than June 2, 2018, 180 days after the Chief Electoral Officer was officially notified of the vacancy via a warrant issued by the Speaker. On May 13, 2018, the writ was dropped for a by-election for June 18, 2018.

Results

2015 result

References

See also 

 By-elections to the 42nd Canadian Parliament

2018 elections in Canada
2018 in Quebec
Federal by-elections in Quebec
Politics of Saguenay, Quebec